Andrey Akopyants (born 27 August 1977) is an Uzbekistani football midfielder of Armenian descent. He last played for Neftchi Farg'ona.

Career
He started his playing career at Pakhtakor in 1996. He played for Pakhtakor in 1996–1999. In 2000, he moved to FC Rostov and completed for club 6 seasons.

International
Akopyants played 40 matches and scored 6 goals for the Uzbekistan national team between 1998 and 2005.

Career statistics

International goals

Honours

Club
Pakhtakor
 Uzbek League (1): 1998
 Uzbek League runners-up (1): 2008
 Uzbek Cup (1) 1997
 Uzbek Cup runners-up (1): 2008

Khimik
 RFPL West conference (1) 2012–13

Individual
Uzbekistan Footballer of the Year: 1999

References

External links

1977 births
Living people
Sportspeople from Tashkent
Ethnic Armenian sportspeople
Uzbekistani footballers
Uzbekistani expatriate footballers
Uzbekistan international footballers
2000 AFC Asian Cup players
2004 AFC Asian Cup players
Uzbekistani people of Armenian descent
Pakhtakor Tashkent FK players
FC Rostov players
FC Chernomorets Novorossiysk players
FC Daugava players
Expatriate footballers in Latvia
Expatriate footballers in Russia
Expatriate footballers in Belarus
Uzbekistani expatriate sportspeople in Latvia
Uzbekistani expatriate sportspeople in Russia
Uzbekistani expatriate sportspeople in Belarus
Russian Premier League players
FC Darida Minsk Raion players
FC Luch Vladivostok players
FC Fakel Voronezh players
FC Nizhny Novgorod (2007) players
FK Dinamo Samarqand players
Footballers at the 1998 Asian Games
Association football forwards
Buxoro FK players
FK Neftchi Farg'ona players
FC Khimik Dzerzhinsk players
Asian Games competitors for Uzbekistan